Ostřešany (until 1923 Vostřešany) is a municipality and village in Pardubice District in the Pardubice Region of the Czech Republic. It has about 1,100 inhabitants.

Notable people
Zdeněk Jičínský (1929–2020), lawyer and politician

References

External links

Villages in Pardubice District